Brian Shales (born June 3, 1985) is a Canadian former pair skater. He represented Canada at the 2005 World Junior Championships.

Career
In the 2004–05 season, Shales and Michelle Cronin won the Canadian national junior title and were selected to compete at the 2005 World Junior Championships, where they placed seventh. During their career, they trained at the Toronto Cricket Skating and Curling Club. Their partnership ended in December 2006.

Shales teamed up with Becky Cosford in 2007. They won the 2007 Ondrej Nepela Memorial silver medal and ended their partnership in 2008. He then teamed up with Brooke Paulin and competed with her in the 2008–09 season, placing 6th at the 2009 Canadian Figure Skating Championships.

He is currently a pairs skating coach at the Skate Oakville Skating Club in Oakville, Ontario alongside Bruno Marcotte.

References

External links
 
 Cosford & Shales profile
 Cronin & Shales profile

Canadian male pair skaters
1985 births
Living people
Sportspeople from Mississauga